In politics,  "the line", "the party line", or "the lines to take" is an idiom for a political party or social movement's canon agenda, as well as ideological elements specific to the organization's partisanship. The common phrase "toeing the party line" describes a person who speaks in a manner that conforms to their political party's agenda.  Likewise, a party-line vote is one in which most or all of the legislators from each political party voted in accordance with that party's policies. In several countries, a whip attempts to ensure this. The Marxist–Leninist concept of democratic centralism involves strict adherence to, and defence of, a communist party's positions in public known as the general line of the party or political line.

According to the American educator Herbert Kohl, writing about debates in New York in the late 1940s and early 1950s, "[t]he term 'politically correct' was used disparagingly to refer to someone whose loyalty to the CP line overrode compassion and led to bad politics. It was used by Socialists against Communists, and was meant to separate out Socialists who believed in equalitarian moral ideas from dogmatic Communists who would advocate and defend party positions regardless of their moral substance."

Used loosely, the phrase "the party line" may also refer to the non-party organizations such as religious groups, business offices, or a social network that may have a semi-official organizational policy or position that is unrelated to any political party.

See also

 Manifesto
 Message discipline
 Party platform

References

Political concepts
Political terminology
Political whips